Coleophora vegrandis is a moth of the family Coleophoridae.

References

vegrandis
Moths described in 1992